Merchants and Planters Bank may refer to:

Merchants and Planters Bank (Clarendon, Arkansas)
Merchants and Planters Bank (Lockport, Louisiana)